The 2019 Copa Colombia, officially the 2019 Copa Águila for sponsorship reasons, was the 17th edition of the Copa Colombia, the national cup competition for clubs of DIMAYOR. The tournament was contested by 36 teams, beginning on 13 February and ending on 6 November, with Independiente Medellín winning their second title by defeating Deportivo Cali in the finals by a 4–3 aggregate score and qualifying for the 2020 Copa Libertadores. Atlético Nacional were the defending champions, but were knocked out of the competition by Deportes Tolima in the quarterfinals.

Format
This year the competition featured the return of the group stage, after being played under a single-elimination format in its entirety in the previous edition. The first stage was played by 28 teams, which were split into seven groups of four teams each based on a regional basis, where teams played each of the teams in their group twice. The seven group winners plus the best second-placed team qualified for the round of 16, where they were joined by the eight teams that qualified for CONMEBOL competitions for the 2019 season: Deportes Tolima, Junior, Independiente Medellín, Atlético Nacional, Once Caldas, La Equidad, Rionegro Águilas and Deportivo Cali. Starting from this point, the cup continued as a single-elimination tournament, with all subsequent rounds being played as double-legged series.

Group stage

Group A

Group B

Group C

Group D

Group E

Group F

Group G

Ranking of second-placed teams
The best team among those ranked second qualified for the knockout stage.

Knockout stage
Each tie in the knockout stage will be played in a home-and-away two-legged format. In each tie, the team which has the better overall record up to that stage will host the second leg, except in the round of 16 where the group winners automatically host the second leg. In case of a tie in aggregate score, neither the away goals rule nor extra time are applied, and the tie is decided by a penalty shoot-out. The teams that qualified for the 2019 Copa Libertadores and 2019 Copa Sudamericana entered the competition in the round of 16, being joined there by the seven group winners and the best second-placed team.

Bracket

Round of 16
The teams qualifying from the group stage played the second leg at home. The first legs were played from 24 July to 8 August 2019, and the second legs were played on 14 and 15 August 2019.

|}

First leg

Second leg

Quarterfinals
The first legs were played on 28 and 29 August 2019, and the second legs were played on 11 and 12 September 2019. Team 2 hosted the second leg.

|}

First leg

Second leg

Semifinals
The first legs were played on 25 September, and the second legs were played on 16 October.

|}

First leg

Second leg

Finals

Independiente Medellín won 4–3 on aggregate.

See also
 2019 Categoría Primera A season
 2019 Categoría Primera B season

References

External links 
  

Copa Colombia seasons
2019 in Colombian football